International Labmate is a multi media publisher and events organiser, the company was founded in 1974 by Michael Pattison. 
 
A chemist by trade Michael started selling analytical instruments in the UK and then in the USA. Shortly after  his return to the UK Michael launched Labmate UK & Ireland a product card booklet for scientists and laboratory managers based in the United Kingdom and Ireland. Labmate UK & Ireland is still being read by laboratory scientists today and has evolved from its original format into a scientific journal containing product announcements,  research and application articles, industry news stories  and conference and exhibition reports.

In 1976 the company expands into Europe with the launch of International Labmate for scientists  based in Europe, the Middle East and Africa. International Labmate highlights the latest research and application reports in chromatography, spectroscopy, microscopy and  new product releases.

2023 Marcus Pattison takes over as Managing Director

History 

In 1990 the company launches International Environmental Technology (IET) for readers in Europe, the Middle East and Africa. Well ahead of its time IET focuses on products and services for Monitoring, testing and analysis of Water, Air and Soil. 25 years on IET is still the only trade magazine focusing on this subject and target market. International Environmental Technology Digital Issues
The magazine features independent application articles, new product announcements, exhibition previews and reviews and technology developments.

In 1994 with the growth in interest from the Asian region and the need for a dedicated publication for the Asian and Australasian markets the company launches LabAsia. LabAsia is read and sent to scientists and laboratories throughout the whole of Asia and Australasia.
More details can be seen here for back issues of the magazine - Lab Asia Magazine Digital editions

In 1996 with continued growth in the Far East the company opens its first international office in Sydney Australia to head up sales for the region. This year also sees the launch of Asian Environmental Technology a focused journal for environmental monitoring and analysis in Asia.
 

In 1999 Petro Industry News is launched the magazine has a worldwide readership and high lights new applications, new product releases, case studies on measurement and analysis of petroleum, petrochemical, chemical and oil products. The magazine is read by scientists, process operators, instrument managers and analytical chemists.Petro Industry News Digital Magazine Issues

In 2002 the company expands into conference and exhibition organisation and launches the MCERTS series of exhibitions with “The Source testing Association”. The events are focused on Emissions monitoring in air.

In 2003 the company launches Measurement Analysis China, written in Chinese the magazine is aimed at Chinese speaking scientists, process operators and instrument managers.

In 2005 the events section of the company launches WWEM “The Water, Wastewater and environmental Monitoring conference and exhibition. WWEM is a specialist event focuses on water monitoring and testing in the laboratory, in the field and in processes. WWEM - The Water, Wastewater and Environmental Monitoring event

In 2008 International Labmate works alongside the UKs’ Chromatographic Society and launches Chromatography Today for analytical scientists who are involved in separation sciences in the United Kingdom and Ireland.
Chromatography Today Website and eBulletin

This year also sees the launch of Pollution Solutions a magazine, website and e-newsletter which focuses on pollution treatment, control and cleanup.
Pollution Solutions Website and eBulletin

In 2009 the company expands its exhibition and conference arm and takes over the organisation and sales for the highly successful series of CEM international conferences and exhibitions. The CEM events are run every two years and move around Europe. Past events have been held in Denmark, The UK, Switzerland, The Netherlands, Italy, Czech Republic and Turkey, they attract delegates from around the world who are involved in Emissions monitoring across all industries.

In 2013 The MCERTS event enters a new phase and expands its remit to now include Air Quality Monitoring and Air Pollution Control, with this expanded format the show now is branded as “AQE” The Air Quality and Emissions Show. This year the company was invited to run and organise the ICMGP International Conference and Exhibition on Mercury as a Global pollutant. AQE Exhibition

In 2015 The company launches PEFTEC a specialist conference and exhibition for the petrochemical, petroleum, and energy industries. PEFTEC

In 2017 The company expands its exhibitions into India and launches the CEM India conference and exhibition on Emission monitoring and is also invited to organise the prestigious HTC conference on Hyphenated Techniques in Chromatography.

In 2020 The company expands its online and events departments and launches its first virtual and e-learning events. https://www.ilmexhibitions.com/

Journals
International Labmate publishes business-to-business trade journals in print and online focusing on the laboratory, life science, environmental and petrochemical industries.

References

British companies established in 1974